Endless Nights in Aurora is a 2014 Taiwanese romantic drama film directed by Lee Szu-yuan. It stars Rainie Yang and Chris Wang. It was released on December 19, 2014.

Plot
Revolving around the romantic relationship of two generations, Alisha and her mother Xiao-feng, two parallel love stories are re-enacted across two and a half decades. With equally heated passion, the star-crossed lovers in different generations are faithfully attached to their experiences in love through promises, anticipation, losses, and forgiveness.

Cast

Rainie Yang as Alisha 
Chris Wang as Kai 
Chi Chin as Wang Xiao-feng (2014) 
Didy Lin as Wang Xiao-feng (1990) 
Austin Lin as Chang Bei-chuan 
Jack Lee as Yolo 
Mandy Wei as Coco
Fan Kuang-yao as Mr. Chang 
  as Mrs. Chang  
Yang Li-yin as Mrs. Yang 
Ralf Chiu as Ralph
Phoebe Huang as Motel owner 
Kimi Hsia as Yuan Yuan
Kuo Tzu-chien as Professor Chen
Chu Te-kang as Doctor 
Chiu Yi-feng as Dede (2014)
Wang Tzu-wei as Dede (1990)

Soundtrack

Reception
The film has grossed NT$8.3 million at the Taipei box office.

References

External links
 
 

2014 romantic drama films
Taiwanese films based on plays
Taiwanese romantic drama films
2014 directorial debut films